The Tattva-saṃgraha is a text written by the 8th century Indian Buddhist pandit Śāntarakṣita. The text belongs to the 'tenets' (Tib. sgrub-mtha) genre and is an encyclopedic survey of Buddhist and non-Buddhist philosophical systems in the 8th century.

Śāntarakṣita's student Kamalashila wrote a commentary on it, entitled Tattva-saṃgraha-pañjikā.

Chapters 
The Tattva-saṃgraha has twenty-six chapters on the following topics:

 The Sāṃkhya doctrine of primordial matter (prakṛti) as the source of the physical world
 Various doctrines of God as the source of the world
 The doctrine of inherent natures (svabhāva) as the source of the world
 Bhartṛhari’s doctrine of Brahman-as-language as the source of the world
 The Sāṃkhya-Yoga doctrine of human spirit (puruṣa)
 Examination of the doctrines of the self (ātman) in the Nyāya, Mīmāṃsā, Sāṃkhya, Digambara Jaina, Advaita and Buddhist personalist (pudgalavādin) schools
 The doctrine of the permanence of things
 Various doctrines of karma and its ripening
 A critical examination of substance
 A critical examination of quality
 A critical examination of action
 A critical examination of universals
 A critical examination of particularity
 A critical examination of inherence (the relation between universals and particulars and between substances and qualities)
 An examination of words and their meanings
 An examination of sense perception
 An examination of inference
 An examination of other means of acquiring knowledge
 A critical examination of Jaina epistemology
 An examination of time
 A critical examination of materialism
 On the external world (that is, the world external to consciousness)
 A critical examination of revelation as a source of knowledge
 Examination of the idea that some propositions are self-validating
 Examination of the notion of supernormal powers

References

External links
 The Tattvasangraha (with commentary) English translation by Ganganatha Jha, 1937 (includes glossary)

Buddhist texts